, also known as  was the 16th Emperor of Japan, according to the traditional order of succession.

While his existence is generally accepted as fact, no firm dates can be assigned to Nintoku's life or reign. He is traditionally considered to have reigned from 313 to 399, although this date is doubted by scholars.

Legendary narrative
The Japanese have traditionally accepted Nintoku's historical existence, and a mausoleum (misasagi) for Nintoku is currently maintained. These chronicles include legends and myths, as well as potential historical facts that have since been exaggerated and/or distorted over time. The Kiki states that Nintoku was born to Nakatsuhime no Mikoto (仲姫命) sometime in 290 AD, and was given the name . According to the Nihon Shoki, he was the fourth son of Emperor Ōjin.

Known information
Nintoku is regarded by historians as a emperor or ruler of the early 5th century. The historical profile of Nintoku is generally accepted as fact without attributing all of the things he allegedly accomplished. Nintoku's contemporary title would not have been tennō, as most historians believe this title was not introduced until the reigns of Emperor Tenmu and Empress Jitō. Rather, it was presumably , meaning "the great king who rules all under heaven". The name "Nintoku" also might have been regularized centuries after the lifetime ascribed to him, possibly during the time in which legends about the origins of the Yamato dynasty were compiled as the chronicles known today as the Kojiki.

Although the Nihon Shoki states that Nintoku ruled from 313 to 399, research suggests those dates are likely inaccurate. William George Aston notes that if they were factual, Nintoku would be 312 years old in his 78th year of reign assuming that the traditional accounts are correct. Outside of the Kiki, the reign of Emperor Kinmei ( – 571 AD) is the first for which contemporary historiography has been able to assign verifiable dates. The conventionally accepted names and dates of the early Emperors were not confirmed as "traditional" though, until the reign of Emperor Kanmu between 737 and 806 AD.

Consorts and children
According to the Nihon Shoki, he was the fourth son of Emperor Ōjin and his mother was Nakatsuhime no Mikoto (仲姫命), a great-granddaughter of Emperor Keikō. He was also the father of Emperors Richū, Hanzei, and Ingyō.

First Son: , later Emperor Richū

Third Son: , later Emperor Hanzei
Fourth Son: , later Emperor Ingyō

Empress (Kōgō): , Emperor Ōjin's daughter (second)

Consort (Hi) : , Morokata no Kimi Ushimoroi's daughter

, married to Emperor Yūryaku

Consort: , daughter of Emperor Ōjin

Consort: , daughter of

Nintoku's tomb 

Daisen Kofun (the largest tomb in Japan) in Sakai, Osaka, is considered to be his final resting place. The actual site of Nintoku's grave is not known.

The Nintoku-ryo tumulus is one of almost 50 tumuli collectively known as "Mozu Kofungun" clustered around the city, and covers the largest area of any tomb in the world. Built in the middle of the 5th century by an estimated 2,000 men working daily for almost 16 years, the Nintoku tumulus, at 486 meters long and with a mound 35 meters high, is twice as long as the base of the famous Great Pyramid of Pharaoh Khufu (Cheops) in Giza.

The Imperial tomb of Nintoku's consort, Iwa-no hime no Mikoto, is said to be located in Saki-cho, Nara City. Both kofun-type Imperial tombs are characterized by a keyhole-shaped island located within a wide, water-filled moat.
Imperial tombs and mausolea are cultural properties; but they are guarded and administered by the Imperial Household Agency (IHA), which is the government department responsible for all matters relating to the Emperor and his family. According to the IHA, the tombs are more than a mere repository for historical artifacts; they are sacred religious sites.  IHA construes each of the Imperial grave sites as sanctuaries for the spirits of the ancestors of the Imperial House.

Nintoku is traditionally venerated at a memorial Shinto shrine (misasagi) at Osaka. The Imperial Household Agency designates this location as his mausoleum.  It is formally named Mozu no Mimihara no naka no misasagi.

Ancestry

See also
 Emperor of Japan
 List of Emperors of Japan
 Imperial cult
 Five kings of Wa
 Ujigami Shrine

Notes

References

Further reading
 Aston, William George. (1896).  Nihongi: Chronicles of Japan from the Earliest Times to A.D. 697. London: Kegan Paul, Trench, Trubner.  
 Brown, Delmer M. and Ichirō Ishida. (1979).  Gukanshō: The Future and the Past. Berkeley: University of California Press. ;  
 Ponsonby-Fane, Richard Arthur Brabazon. (1959).  The Imperial House of Japan. Kyoto: Ponsonby Memorial Society. 
 Titsingh, Isaac. (1834). Nihon Ōdai Ichiran; ou,  Annales des empereurs du Japon.  Paris: Royal Asiatic Society, Oriental Translation Fund of Great Britain and Ireland.  
 Varley, H. Paul. (1980). Jinnō Shōtōki: A Chronicle of Gods and Sovereigns. New York: Columbia University Press. ;  

 
 

Japanese emperors
People of Kofun-period Japan
4th-century monarchs in Asia
4th-century Japanese monarchs
Year of birth unknown
Year of death unknown
Longevity myths